Makoye Isangula is a Tanzanian Olympic boxer. He represented his country in the middleweight division at the 1992 Summer Olympics. He won his first bout against Siamak Varzideh, and then lost his second bout to Albert Papilaya.

References

1964 births
Living people
Tanzanian male boxers
Olympic boxers of Tanzania
Boxers at the 1992 Summer Olympics
African Games gold medalists for Tanzania
African Games medalists in boxing
Competitors at the 1991 All-Africa Games
Middleweight boxers